Employees Retirement System of Texas (ERS) is an agency of the Texas state government.

ERS was created in 1947. It oversees retirement benefits of state employees. It is headquartered at 200 E 18th Street in Austin, Texas. It is currently managed by CIO Tom Tull.

Funding 
As of 2020, the total unfunded liabilities of ERS is $14.7 billion.

References

http://dfs-marketing.com
http://myretirementsaving.com

External links

 Employees Retirement System of Texas

  Retirement Plan

State agencies of Texas
1947 establishments in Texas
Public pension funds in the United States